Rojen Barnas is the pen name of Mehmet Gemici (born 1945), a contemporary Kurdish poet and writer. He was born in the Diyarbakır region in south-eastern Turkey. He became active in Kurdish politics in the 1970s. He has made his home in Sweden since 1981. He started publishing a Kurdish magazine called  in the 1970s.

Works
In the early dawn (Li bandeva spêde), Izmir, 1980.
The moon in the sky of Diyarbakir (Heyv li esmanê Diyarbekirê), 119 pp., 1984. .
The kingdom of love (Milkê Evînê), 81 pp., Nûdem Publishers, Stockholm, 1995. .
Then (Hingê), 83 pp., Nûdem Publishers, Stockholm, 1997. (short stories)

References
Sources
The works of Rojen Barnas, Immigrant Institute, 

Notes

1945 births
Living people
Kurdish-language writers
Turkish people of Kurdish descent
Turkish emigrants to Sweden